Martina Strähl (born 7 May 1987) is a Swiss female long-distance runner and mountain runner, world champion at the World Long Distance Mountain Running Championships (2015) and twice at the European Mountain Running Championships (2009, 2011).

Biography
Strähl won a silver (2006) and a bronze medal (2010) at individual senior level  at the World Mountain Running Championships and others three medals with the national team. In 2015 at the World Long Distance Mountain Running Championships won also the gold medal at senior level with the national team and four others medals with the national team at the European Mountain Running Championships.

She won Zermatt marathon in 2015 (marathon distance) and 2019 (half marathon distance).

National records
 15K run: 48:54 ( Berlin, 8 April 2018) - current holder
 Half marathon: 1:09:29 ( Berlin, 8 April 2018) - current holder

Achievements

National titles
Strähl won three national championships at individual senior level.
Swiss Athletics Championships
5000 metres: 2010, 2011
Marathon: 2018

See also
 List of Swiss records in athletics

References

External links
 
 

1987 births
Living people
Swiss female long-distance runners
Swiss female marathon runners
Swiss female mountain runners
World Long Distance Mountain Running Championships winners
Athletes (track and field) at the 2020 Summer Olympics
Olympic athletes of Switzerland
People from Solothurn
Sportspeople from the canton of Solothurn